Markus von Ahlen (born 1 January 1971) is a German football manager and a former player. He manages the Under-19 squad of Fortuna Köln.

Coaching career
von Ahlen started his coaching career in the youth section at Bayer Leverkusen in 2007 before moving to the youth section at Hamburger SV in 2008. He then signed a two–year deal on 18 April 2011 to become the new head coach of Arminia Bielefeld starting at the beginning of the 2011–12 season. However, his tenure ended prematurely on 20 September 2011. He failed to win any of his 11 competitive matches. He then became an assistant coach for Kapfenberger SV before moving to the reserve team of 1860 München on 20 December 2012 until the end of the season. Then he became an assistant coach with 1860 München until he became interim head coach on 6 April 2014. He was given the mandate for the rest of the 2013–14 season. His tenure finished when Ricardo Moniz was hired as the permanent head coach on 4 June 2014. Von Ahlen once again became head coach of the first team after Moniz was sacked. He was sacked on 17 February 2015. In July 2016 he became manager of the Under-19 squad of Bayer Leverkusen. In January 2022 he became new manager of Bonner SC. On 3 May 2022 he was sacked by Bonner only to be named new manager of Fortuna Köln one hour later.

Coaching record

Honours
Bayer Leverkusen
 DFB-Pokal: 1992–93

References

1971 births
Living people
German footballers
Association football midfielders
Bayer 04 Leverkusen players
Bayer 04 Leverkusen II players
VfL Bochum players
SV Meppen players
KFC Uerdingen 05 players
Alemannia Aachen players
Bundesliga players
2. Bundesliga players
German football managers
Arminia Bielefeld managers
TSV 1860 Munich managers
Bonner SC managers
SC Fortuna Köln managers
3. Liga managers
People from Bergisch Gladbach
Sportspeople from Cologne (region)
Footballers from North Rhine-Westphalia